Photinastoma is a genus of sea snails, marine gastropod mollusks in the family Calliostomatidae within the superfamily Trochoidea, the top snails, turban snails and their allies.

Description
Unlike the other genera in the family Calliostomatidae, the genus Photinastoma has almost smooth shells, lacking the beaded sculpture. The protoconch is large. There are some strong spiral cords in the early teleoconch.

Species
Species within the genus Photinastoma include:
 Photinastoma taeniatum (Sowerby I, 1825)

References

External links
 To ITIS
 To World Register of Marine Species

 
Calliostomatidae
Monotypic gastropod genera